Schizopyrenida is an order of Heterolobosea.

It contains Naegleria fowleri.

References

Percolozoa